James Brendan Patterson (born March 22, 1947) is an American author. Among his works are the Alex Cross, Michael Bennett, Women's Murder Club, Maximum Ride, Daniel X, NYPD Red, Witch & Wizard, Private and Middle School series, as well as many stand-alone thrillers, non-fiction, and romance novels. His books have sold more than 425 million copies, and he was the first person to sell 1 million e-books. In 2016, Patterson topped Forbes list of highest-paid authors for the third consecutive year, with an income of $95 million. His total income over a decade is estimated at $700 million.

In November 2015, Patterson received the Literarian Award from the National Book Foundation, which cited him as a "passionate campaigner to make books and reading a national priority." Patterson has donated millions of dollars in grants and scholarship to various universities, teachers' colleges, independent bookstores, school libraries, and college students to promote literacy.

Early life
James Patterson was born on March 22, 1947, in Newburgh, New York, the son of Isabelle, a homemaker and teacher, and Charles Patterson, an insurance broker. The family was working-class and of Irish descent. He graduated summa cum laude with a B.A. in English from Manhattan College and an M.A. in English from Vanderbilt University.

Career
Patterson was a PhD candidate at Vanderbilt when he took a job as an advertising executive at J. Walter Thompson. After he retired from advertising in 1996, he devoted his time to writing. His greatest influence, he said later, was probably Evan S. Connell's 1959 debut novel Mrs. Bridge. In 1976, he published his first novel, The Thomas Berryman Number. The novels featuring his character Alex Cross, a forensic psychologist formerly of the Washington DC. Metropolitan Police and Federal Bureau of Investigation who now works as a private psychologist and government consultant, are his most popular and the top-selling U.S. detective series of the 2010s. Patterson has written more than 200 novels since 1976. He has had more than 114 New York Times bestselling novels, and holds The New York Times record for most #1 New York Times bestsellers by a single author—67—which is also a Guinness World Record. His novels account for one in 17, roughly 6%, of all hardcover novels sold in the United States; in recent years his novels have sold more copies than those of Stephen King, John Grisham, and Dan Brown combined. His books have sold approximately 305 million copies worldwide. In 2008, he replaced Jacqueline Wilson as the most borrowed author in Britain's libraries. He retained this position at least until 2013. In 2018, he worked with Stephen David Entertainment on the true crime television series James Patterson's Murder Is Forever.

Patterson's awards include the Edgar Award, the BCA Mystery Guild's Thriller of the Year, the International Thriller of the Year award, and the Children's Choice Book Award for Author of the Year. He is the first author to have No. 1 new titles simultaneously on The New York Times adult and children's bestsellers lists, and to have two books on NovelTrackr's top-ten list at the same time. In 2019, Patterson was awarded a National Humanities Medal. He appeared on the Fox TV show The Simpsons (in the episode "Yokel Chords") and in various episodes of Castle as himself.

Patterson works with a variety of co-authors, such as J.D. Barker, Candice Fox, Maxine Paetro, Andrew Gross, Mark Sullivan, Ashwin Sanghi, Michael Ledwidge, and Peter de Jonge. In May 2017, it was announced that Patterson would also co-author a crime fiction book with former U.S. President Bill Clinton. Patterson said the novel, The President Is Missing, would provide a level of detail that only a former U.S. president can offer. Patterson has often said that collaborating with others brings new and interesting ideas to his stories. Of his process, he has said that he is simply more proficient at dreaming up plots than crafting sentence after sentence.

In September 2009, Patterson signed a deal to write or co-write 11 books for adults and 6 for young adults by the end of 2012. Forbes reported the deal was worth at least $150 million, but according to Patterson the estimate was inaccurate.

Patterson founded the James Patterson PageTurner Awards in 2005 to donate over $100,000 that year to people, companies, schools, and other institutions that find original and effective ways to spread the excitement of books and reading. The PageTurner Awards were put on hold in 2008 to focus on Patterson's new initiative, ReadKiddoRead.com, which assists parents, teachers, and librarians in finding books for their children. The social networking site for ReadKiddoRead is hosted by Ning. The website is inspired by methods Patterson used with his own son, Jack, who had been a reluctant reader. He has also set up the James Patterson Teacher Education Scholarship in the schools of education at Appalachian State University, Michigan State University, Florida Atlantic University, and the University of Florida. Patterson also runs the College Book Bucks scholarship program. Recently, his JP Entertainment company signed a first-look deal with Entertainment One.

In June 2022, Patterson set off a controversy when he said in an interview that older white males find it difficult to find work in film, theater, television and publishing, and that the problem is "just another form of racism". Patterson's publishing house, Hachette, has a workforce that is 65% white and 78% of senior positions are filled by whites. Following publication of data confirming that white males are overrepresented in the publishing field, Patterson apologized on Facebook for his accusations of racism. "I apologize for saying white male writers having trouble finding work is a form of racism. I absolutely do not believe that racism is practiced against white writers. Please know that I strongly support a diversity of voices being heard—in literature, in Hollywood, everywhere."

Reception
Patterson has been criticized for co-authoring many of his books and for being more of a brand that focuses on making money than an artist who focuses on his craft.

In an interview for USA Weekend, Stephen King said Patterson was "a terrible writer but he's very successful." King also implied, when asked on The Late Show with Stephen Colbert about how many hours it takes him to write a book, that Patterson needed only 12 hours for two books, noting he and Patterson had "a mutual respect—sort of". Patterson said of King in a Wall Street Journal interview, "He's taken shots at me for years. It's fine, but my approach is to do the opposite with him—to heap praise."

Legal thriller writer Lisa Scottoline said in a review of Patterson's Kill Alex Cross, "They used to say that 50 million Elvis Presley fans couldn't be wrong, and James Patterson makes 50 million fans look like a good start. He has sold more than 230 million books, and his fans aren't wrong, either."

In 2013, Patterson took out ads titled "Who Will Save Our Books? Our Bookstores? Our Libraries?" in Publishers Weekly and The New York Times Book Review, which employed the text "If there are no bookstores, no libraries, no serious publishers with passionate, dedicated, idealistic editors, what will happen to our literature? Who will discover and mentor new writers? Who will publish our important books? What will happen if there are no more books like these?" Patterson called the ads an attempt to "stir the pot a little bit." Digital Book World called the ads "refreshing, really. And brave." Maureen Sullivan, president of the American Library Association, told the Tampa Bay Times she was writing Patterson a thank-you letter.

In 2017, digital humanities scholars Simon Fuller and James O'Sullivan published research showing that Patterson does not do much actual writing when collaborating with other authors. O'Sullivan writes: "Patterson is all about story... 'author', in its widely accepted sense, isn't always the most appropriate term for his role within the writing process." O'Sullivan later conducted the same analysis on The President is Missing, a collaboration between Patterson and Bill Clinton; here O'Sullivan concludes that Patterson did most of the writing, aside from the end of the novel.

Book banning 
In March 2023, Patterson's Maximum Ride was banned by Florida's Martin County School District. Patterson criticized the move, calling it a "borderline absurd decision", and encouraged readers to "send a polite note" to Florida Governor Ron DeSantis in response to legislation passed to seek community input on school library materials.

Personal life
Patterson, his wife, Susan, and their son live in Lake Worth Beach in Palm Beach County, Florida. In 2015, Patterson established the James Patterson Pledge with Scholastic Book Clubs to put books in the hands of young readers.

Bibliography

Adaptations 
 Child of Darkness, Child of Light (1991), telefilm directed by Marina Sargenti, based on novel Virgin, or Cradle and All
 Kiss the Girls (1997), film directed by Gary Fleder, based on novel Kiss the Girls
 Miracle on the 17th Green (1999), telefilm directed by Michael Switzer, based on novel Miracle on the 17th Green
 Along Came a Spider (2001), film directed by Lee Tamahori, based on novel Along Came a Spider
 First to Die (2003), telefilm directed by Russell Mulcahy, based on novel 1st to Die
 Suzanne's Diary for Nicholas (2005), telefilm directed by Richard Friedenberg, based on novel Suzanne's Diary for Nicholas
 Women's Murder Club (2007–2008), series created by Elizabeth Craft and Sarah Fain, based on novels of Women's Murder Club series
 Sundays at Tiffany's (2010), telefilm directed by Mark Piznarski, based on novel Sundays at Tiffany's
 Alex Cross (2012), film directed by Rob Cohen, based on novel Cross, or Alex Cross
 Zoo (2015–2017), series based on novel Zoo Maximum Ride (2016), film directed by Jay Martin, based on novels of Maximum Ride series
 Middle School: The Worst Years of My Life (2016), film directed by Steve Carr, based on children's novel Middle School: The Worst Years of My Life James Patterson's the Chef (2018), miniseries directed by Nico Casavecchia and Gabe Michael, based on novel The Chef Instinct (2018–2019), series created by Michael Rauch, based on novel Murder Games, or Instinct The Postcard Killings (2020), film directed by Danis Tanović, based on novel The Postcard Killers Jeffrey Epstein: Filthy Rich (2020), miniseries co-written by John Connolly and Tim Malloy and based on Filthy Rich''

Filmography
2009 Castle As himself

References

External links

 
 
 James Patterson at the Internet Book List
 
 

1947 births
20th-century American male writers
20th-century American novelists
20th-century American philanthropists
21st-century American male writers
21st-century American novelists
21st-century American philanthropists
American advertising executives
American founders
American male novelists
American mystery novelists
American patrons of literature
American romantic fiction novelists
American science fiction writers
American thriller writers
American writers of Irish descent
American writers of young adult literature
Edgar Award winners
Living people
Manhattan College alumni
National Humanities Medal recipients
People from Briarcliff Manor, New York
People from Newburgh, New York
Novelists from Florida
Novelists from New York (state)
Patrons of schools
People from Lake Worth Beach, Florida
Vanderbilt University alumni